(born June 23, 1966) is a Japanese actress known for her appearances on the Super Sentai TV series Hikari Sentai Maskman, Toei's eleventh entry of the series. She is known as Momoko (モモコ) in the series.

Filmography

References

External links

Living people
Japanese actresses
1966 births